Gran Prix San Luis Femenino is a women's staged cycle race which takes place in Argentina.

Overall winners

References

Sport in San Luis Province
Cycle races in Argentina